Cowley Railway Station was a station on the Uxbridge branch of the Great Western Railway in Cowley, London.

The station was opened to serve the small settlement of Cowley. It opened in 1904, nearly fifty years after the rest of the line from West Drayton had been constructed. It was the only intermediate station on the line, situated between Uxbridge Vine Street and West Drayton railway station. It closed to passengers on 10 September 1962, along with the remainder of the branch, but freight trains went through to Uxbridge Vine Street until 1964. Only the stretch of the line from West Drayton Station to the Grand Union Canal survived longer. This was for a freight service to the Middlesex Oil and Chemical Works in Yiewsley which stopped in 1979. 

Cowley station has since been demolished and built over, and today there are only a few signs of its former existence, including a railway bridge and "Station Road". The station had two platforms, a station building on the southbound platform and a small shelter (also pre-1940, a ticket machine) on the other.

It was once part of early 20th century plans for a longer rail line from Denham to Staines via Uxbridge and West Drayton but the section linking Uxbridge High Street railway station and a point south of Uxbridge Vine Street was not built.

See also
 List of closed railway stations in London
 Uxbridge High Street railway station

References

External links
Disused stations website with photos

Disused railway stations in the London Borough of Hillingdon
Former Great Western Railway stations
Former buildings and structures in the London Borough of Hillingdon
Railway stations in Great Britain opened in 1904
Railway stations in Great Britain closed in 1962
Railway station